There are three lakes of the name Svínavatn in Iceland.
 A lake to the south of Blönduós. Its surface measures 12 km2.
 A very small lake in the valley Heydalur  near Hvammsfjörður on the peninsula of Snæfellsnes.
 Another smaller lake to the west of Blöndulón at the north end of Kjölur highland road.

See also
List of lakes of Iceland

References

Lakes of Iceland